The list of windmills in England is split by county:

Windmills